The Association of the Xaintois communes (French: Communauté de communes du Xaintois) is a former administrative association of rural communes in the Vosges département of eastern France and in the region of Lorraine. It was created in December 1998. It was merged into the Communauté de communes du Pays de Mirecourt in January 2014, which was merged into the new Communauté de communes de Mirecourt Dompaire in January 2017.

The association had its administrative offices at Oëlleville.

Composition 
The Communauté de communes comprised the following communes:

Biécourt
Blémerey
Boulaincourt
Chef-Haut
Frenelle-la-Grande
Frenelle-la-Petite
Oëlleville
Repel
Saint-Prancher
Totainville

References

Xaintois